Virginie Ruffenach (born 19 September 1973 in Noumea) is a politician from New Caledonia. She is a member of The Rally and the chairperson of the Future with Confidence alliance in the Congress of New Caledonia.

Biography
Ruffenach was born in Noumea and grew up in town of Dumbéa where her parents worked. She left New Caledonia to study a degree in chemistry at the University of Strasbourg before working as a teacher and a school inspector.

She has been a member of The Rally since 2007 and is a vice-president of the party.

References 

New Caledonian women in politics
The Rally (New Caledonia) politicians
New Caledonia politicians
Living people
1973 births
Members of the Congress of New Caledonia
People from Nouméa
New Caledonian people of French descent